UCAS may be the acronym of the Universities & Colleges Admissions Service, a clearing house for applications to degree programmes at British universities and colleges.

UCAS may also refer to:
University of the Chinese Academy of Sciences, a public research university in Beijing, China
Unified Canadian Aboriginal Syllabics, formal name of a script
Unified Canadian Aboriginal syllabics (Unicode block), encoded script
Unmanned Combat Air System(s)
Joint Unmanned Combat Air Systems (J-UCAS)
Unmanned Combat Air System Demonstrator program (UCAS-D)
Utah County Academy of Sciences, a small charter high school in Orem, Utah, United States
 The United Canadian and American States, a country in the fictional Shadowrun universe.